Gelechia albatella is a moth of the family Gelechiidae. It is found in Sri Lanka.

Adults are whitish, the forewings speckled with fawn-colour and with the exterior border extremely oblique.

References

Moths described in 1864
Gelechia